Edgerley is a former civil parish, now in the parish of Churton, in the borough of Cheshire West and Chester and ceremonial county of Cheshire in England. In 2001 it had a population of 7.

History 
The name "Edgerley" means 'Ecghere's wood/clearing'. Edgerley was formerly a township in the parish of Aldford, from 1866 Edgerley was a civil parish in its own right until it was abolished in 2015 to form Churton.

References

Former civil parishes in Cheshire
Cheshire West and Chester